Baron Kerry is an ancient title in the Peerage of Ireland named after County Kerry. It was created circa 1223 for Thomas FitzMaurice, Lord OConnello, son of Maurice FitzGerald, Lord of Llanstephan.

In 1325, Maurice FitzMaurice, 4th Baron Kerry, murdered Diarmaid Óg MacCarthy (son of Cormac Mór MacCarthy) in the courtroom at Tralee. For this act, Maurice was tried and attainted by the parliament in Dublin and his lands forfeited, but after his death they were restored to his brother John FitzMaurice, 5th Baron of Kerry.

The title was sometimes given as Baron Lixnaw (after Lixnaw) or Baron Kerry and Lixnaw. In a 1615 dispute with Baron Slane over precedence, it was claimed the title "Baron Lixnaw" was promoted by the rival Earl of Desmond, who wanted "Baron Kerry" to be a a courtesy title for his heir. The Privy Council of Ireland's ruling in the dispute referred to Baron Kerry as both "Lo[rd] of Kierry" and "Baron of Kierry and Licksnawe" .

In 1537 the eleventh Baron was created Baron Odorney and Viscount Kilmaule in the Peerage of Ireland. However, these titles became extinct on his death in 1541 while he was succeeded in the Barony of Kerry by his younger brother. The twenty-first Baron was created Earl of Kerry in the Peerage of Ireland in 1723. His younger son John Petty Fitzmaurice was created the 1st Earl of Shelbourne in the Peerage of Ireland in 1753 and his son William Petty FitzMaurice the 2nd Earl of Shelburne served as British Prime Minister from (1782_1783) and was created Marquess of Lansdowne in 1784. In 1818 the latter's son, the third Marquess, succeeded his cousin as 4th Earl of Kerry and 24th Baron Kerry.

Barons Kerry (1223)
Thomas Fitzmaurice, 1st Baron Kerry (died ) According to John O'Hart, his father was Maurice FitzRaymond, the fourth son of Raymond FitzGerald le Gros and Basilia  de  Clare
Maurice Fitzthomas Fitzmaurice, 2nd Baron Kerry (died 1303)
Nicholas Fitzmaurice, 3rd Baron Kerry (died 1324)
Maurice Fitzmaurice, 4th Baron Kerry (died 1339)
John Fitzmaurice, 5th Baron Kerry (died 1348)
Maurice Fitzmaurice, 6th Baron Kerry (died 1398)
Patrick Fitzmaurice, 7th Baron Kerry (died )
Thomas Fitzmaurice, 8th Baron Kerry (died 1469)
Edmond Fitzmaurice, 9th Baron Kerry (died 1498)
Edmond Fitzmaurice, 10th Baron Kerry (died 1543) resigned his estates to become a lay brother in Ardfert Abbey
Edmond Fitzmaurice, 11th Baron Kerry (died 1541) (created Viscount Kilmaule in 1537)

Viscounts Kilmaule (1537)
Edmond Fitzmaurice, 1st Viscount Kilmaule (died 1541) (extinct)

Barons Kerry (1223; Reverted)
Patrick Fitzmaurice, 12th Baron Kerry (died 1547)
Thomas Fitzmaurice, 13th Baron Kerry (died 1549) 
Edmond Fitzmaurice, 14th Baron Kerry (died 1549) 
Gerard Fitzmaurice, 15th Baron Kerry (died 1550) 
Thomas Fitzmaurice, 16th Baron Kerry (–1590) 
Patrick Fitzmaurice, 17th Baron Kerry (c. 1541–1600) 
Thomas Fitzmaurice, 18th Baron Kerry (1574–1630)
Patrick Fitzmaurice, 19th Baron Kerry (1595–1661)
William FitzMaurice, 20th Baron Kerry (1633–1697)
Thomas Fitzmaurice, 21st Baron Kerry (1668–1741) (created Earl of Kerry in 1723)

Earls of Kerry (1723)
Thomas FitzMaurice, 1st Earl of Kerry (1668–1741)
William FitzMaurice, 2nd Earl of Kerry (1694–1747)
Francis Thomas-Fitzmaurice, 3rd Earl of Kerry (1740–1818)
Henry Petty-Fitzmaurice, 3rd Marquess of Lansdowne, 4th Earl of Kerry (1780–1863)
See Marquess of Lansdowne for further Earls of Kerry.

Sources

Citations

Earldoms in the Peerage of Ireland

Noble titles created in 1723